Hyperion Solutions Corporation was a software company located in Santa Clara, California, which was acquired by Oracle Corporation in 2007.
Hyperion Solutions was formed from the merger of Hyperion Software (formerly IMRS) and Arbor Software in 1998.

History
 1981 - IMRS founded by Bob Thomson and Marco Arese
 1983 - IMRS launches financial and management consolidation software called "Micro Control"
 1985 - IMRS hires Jim Perakis as CEO; he remains in this position during growth from $1M to almost $300M
 1991 - IMRS becomes a public company and launches a Windows-based successor to 'Micro Control' called 'Hyperion'
 1992 - Arbor Software ships first version of Essbase Online Analytical processing OLAP software
 1995 - Due to the success of the "Hyperion" product IMRS changes name to "Hyperion Software Corporation" and the name of the product is changed to "Hyperion Enterprise." Arbor becomes a publicly held company
 1997 - Arbor acquires Appsource
 1998 - Hyperion Software merges with Arbor and the combined company is renamed Hyperion Solutions
 1999 - Jeffrey Rodek named as Hyperion Chairman and CEO of Hyperion. Hyperion acquires Sapling Corporation (Enterprise Performance Management applications)
 2001 - Godfrey Sullivan is named Hyperion President and COO
 2003 - Hyperion acquires Brio Technology and The Alcar Group
 2004 - Hyperion names Jeffrey Rodek Executive Chairman; Godfrey Sullivan President and CEO
 2005 - Hyperion acquires Razza Solutions (Master data management) and appoints Northdoor as a reseller in the UK and Ireland.
 2006 - Hyperion acquires UpStream (Financial Data Quality Management)
 2006 - Hyperion acquires Beatware (Data visualization for Web and Mobile Devices)
 2007 - Hyperion acquired Decisioneering (Crystal Ball software).
Oracle Corporation announced on March 1, 2007 it had agreed to purchase Hyperion Solutions Corporation for $3.3 billion in cash. 
The transaction was completed on April 18, 2007 and Hyperion now operates as a division of Oracle.
Oracle extended support for most Hyperion products (v11.1.2.x) to 2018.
Hyperion BI tools were bundled into Oracle Business Intelligence Suite Enterprise Edition.

Market
Vendors in the business intelligence space are often categorized into:
 The consolidated big four "megavendors", which include Oracle Hyperion as well as SAP BusinessObjects, IBM Cognos, and Microsoft BI.
 The independent "pure-play" vendors, the largest being MicroStrategy, Tableau, QlikView and SAS.

BI market surveys and analyses include:
 Gartner's BI Magic Quadrant - In 2007, Gartner placed Hyperion in its "Leader" quadrant for both Business Intelligence Platforms and Corporate Performance Management.
 Business Application Research Center (BARC)'s The BI Survey and The BI Verdict (formerly The OLAP Report)

Products
Hyperion software products included:
 Essbase
 Hyperion Intelligence and SQR Production Reporting (products acquired in 2003 takeover of Brio Technology)
 Hyperion Enterprise
 Hyperion Planning
 Hyperion Strategic Finance
 Hyperion Financial Data Management
 Hyperion Enterprise Performance Management Architect
 Hyperion Financial Close Management
 Hyperion Account Reconciliation
 Hyperion Disclosure Management
 Hyperion Performance Scorecard
 Hyperion Business Modelling
 Hyperion Financial Management
 Hyperion Master Data Management/Oracle Data Relationship Management
 Hyperion Financial Reporting
 Hyperion Web Analysis
 Hyperion SmartView
 Hyperion EPM Workspace
 Hyperion Profitability and Cost Management
 Hyperion System 9 BI+ (a combination of Interactive Reporting, SQR, Web Analysis, Financial Reporting, EPM Workspace and SmartView)
 Hyperion Financial Data Quality Management (also referred to as FDMEE, for Enterprise Edition)
 Hyperion Tax Provision
 Planning Budgeting Cloud Service
 Enterprise Performance Reporting Cloud Service

References

External links
 
 The Hyperion Developer Network
 Hyperion Press Kit

Software companies based in the San Francisco Bay Area
Software companies established in 1981
Defunct software companies of the United States
Oracle acquisitions
Business software companies
Companies based in Santa Clara, California
2007 mergers and acquisitions